Gopal Rai (born May 10, 1975) is the Minister for Environment, Forest & Wildlife, Development and General Administration in Government of Delhi under the leadership of Delhi Chief Minister Arvind Kejriwal. He is also social activist and a member of the Political Affairs Committee of the Aam Aadmi Party.

Background and education
Gopal Rai is a Post-graduate in  Sociology from Lucknow University, 1998. He began his career with the All India Students Association, the student wing of the Communist Party of India (Marxist-Leninist) Liberation, in Lucknow University in 1992. He is a member of the National Executive of the Aam Aadmi party.

Political career
Rai began his career with All India Students Association in Lucknow University in 1992. He is partially paralyzed as he was shot during his student days in Lucknow. He and two other members led "Mein Bhi Aam Aadmi" campaign which started on 10 January and continued till 26 January 2014, for handling fund collection, association and management of other political groups.

Rai lost the election from the  Babarpur constituency, got 25723 votes and stood in 3rd place in the 2013 Delhi Legislative Assembly election. He was elected as MLA from Babarpur constituency in Delhi Legislative election, 2015 on 10th Feb. and got the ministry of Transport and Labour.

On 13 December 2013, the fourth day of Anna Hazare's indefinite hunger strike for passage of Jan Lokpal Bill in Ralegaon Siddhi, a verbal spat between VK Singh and Gopal Rai took place, forcing Anna to ask Rai to leave Ralegaon.

Cabinet Minister, Delhi
He is a cabinet minister in the Third Kejriwal ministry and holds the charge of below listed departments of the Government of Delhi.
 Development.
 General Administration.
 Environment.

Electoral performance

References 
 

Living people
Activists from Delhi
Delhi MLAs 2015–2020
Delhi MLAs 2020–2025
Aam Aadmi Party MLAs from Delhi
1975 births
Delhi politicians